Abela is a surname. 

Notable people with the surname include:

 Anthony Abela (1954–2006), Maltese sociologist
 Carmelo Abela (born 1972), Maltese Labour MP
 Deborah Abela (born 1966), Australian children's writer
 Eduardo Abela (1889–1965), Cuban painter
 George Abela (born 1948), President of Malta from 2009 to 2014
 Georgina Abela (born 1959), Maltese singer and musician
 Giovanni Francesco Abela (1582–1655), Maltese of noble birth, author of Malta illustrata
 Lucas Abela, Australian noise musician
 Margaret Abela (born 1949), former First Lady of Malta
 Marisa Abela (born 1996), English actress
 Marlon Abela, Lebanese-born British restaurateur
 Robert Abela (born 1977), Prime Minister of Malta
 Toni Abela, Maltese judge
 Wistin Abela (1933–2014), Maltese politician

See also 
 Abella (surname)
 Abila (disambiguation)

References 

Maltese-language surnames